Lady Guo may refer to women in imperial China with the surname Guo, including:

Guo Huai (wife of Jia Chong) (237–296)
Lady Guo (wife of Wang Yan) (died 300), Guo Huai's niece
Princess Dowager Guo ( 363), Zhang Chonghua's concubine

See also
Empress Guo (disambiguation)
Consort Guo (disambiguation)